Iuka is a village in Marion County, Illinois, United States. The population was 512 at the 2020 census.

Geography
Iuka is located in eastern Marion County at  (38.617678, -88.788400). U.S. Route 50 passes through the north side of the village, leading west  to Salem, the county seat, and east  to Flora.

Jamison Creek crosses the north side of the village, running east to the Skillet Fork, a southeast-flowing tributary of the Little Wabash River. The southernmost part of the village drains to Johns Branch, a more southerly tributary of the Skillet Fork.

Demographics

As of the census of 2010, there were 489 people, 185 households, and 127 families residing in the village. The racial makeup of the village was 98.6% White, 1.4% African American, 0.2% Asian, and 0.2% from two or more races. Hispanic or Latino of any race were 0.8% of the population.

There were 185 households, out of which 35.7% had children under the age of 18 living with them, 50.8% were married couples living together, 10.3% had a female householder with no husband present, and 31.4% were non-families. 25.4% of all households were made up of individuals, and 7.8% had someone living alone who was 65 years of age or older. The average household size was 2.64 and the average family size was 3.08.

In the village, the population was spread out, with 33.4% under the age of 19, 5.7% from 20 to 24, 25.9% from 25 to 44, 22.0% from 45 to 64, and 12.9% who were 65 years of age or older. The median age was 33.1 years. For every 100 females, there were 93.3 males. For every 100 females age 18 and over, there were 97.2 males.

Points of interest
There is a limestone outcropping due southeast of Iuka that is one of the purported locations of Burrows Cave. In 1982, Russell E. Burrow claimed to have found numerous archeological artifacts in this cave inscribed in Ancient Egyptian and Greek. Today, Burrows Cave is considered a hoax by most mainstream archeologists.

The building is now a State Historic Site. It is claimed that Abraham Lincoln stayed at the inn, though there is no proof of his presence at the tavern. It is also believed that a group of Native Americans robbed gold from a passing stagecoach in the early 1800s, and that the gold is buried in a wooded area to the north of the tavern, but cited evidence questions the legitimacy of this claim.

Further east along U.S. Route 50 lies the Hebron School, a wooden one-room schoolhouse that operated between 1908 and 1952.

References

External links

Villages in Illinois
Villages in Marion County, Illinois